Cherry Mobile Flare (or simply Flare) is a series of Android-powered smartphones designed, manufactured and marketed by Cherry Mobile.

Model comparison

References

Smartphones